Abaris is a genus of beetles in the family Carabidae, containing the following species:

 Abaris aenea Dejean, 1831
 Abaris aequinoctialis Chaudoir, 1852
 Abaris aquilonaria Will, 2002
 Abaris basistriata Chaudoir, 1873
 Abaris bicolor Will, 2002
 Abaris bigenera Bates, 1882
 Abaris convexa Will, 2002
 Abaris erwini Will, 2002
 Abaris franiai Will, 2002
 Abaris impunctata Will, 2002
 Abaris inaequaloides Will, 2002
 Abaris inflata Will, 2002
 Abaris metallica Will, 2002
 Abaris mina Will, 2002
 Abaris napoensis Will, 2002
 Abaris nigra Will, 2002
 Abaris nitida Will, 2002
 Abaris nobilis Will, 2002
 Abaris notiophiloides Bates, 1871
 Abaris opaca Will, 2002
 Abaris picipes Bates, 1871
 Abaris retiaria Will, 2002
 Abaris robustula Tschitscherine, 1898
 Abaris splendidula (LeConte, 1863)
 Abaris striolata Bates, 1871
 Abaris tachypoides Bates, 1871
 Abaris wardi Will, 2002

References

Pterostichinae